Islam Cana'an (born May 21, 1983) is a footballer who plays for Ihud Bnei Majd al-Krum.

Life
A product of the youth system at Maccabi Haifa, he was brought into the first team for the start of the 2005-06 Israeli Premier League season after being loaned out to gain playing experience. After not finding his way onto the pitch in the 2006–07 season, it was decided at Maccabi Haifa to loan him out yet again to Maccabi Herzliya. After going out on loan to Herzliya, Cana'an left Israel to join Uruguayan club, Peñarol.

Statistics

References

External links 
 

1983 births
Living people
Arab citizens of Israel
Israeli footballers
Israeli expatriate footballers
Maccabi Haifa F.C. players
Hapoel Haifa F.C. players
Bnei Sakhnin F.C. players
Hapoel Nof HaGalil F.C. players
Maccabi Ahi Nazareth F.C. players
Maccabi Umm al-Fahm F.C. players
Ihud Bnei Majd al-Krum F.C. players
Israeli Premier League players
Liga Leumit players
Peñarol players
Arab-Israeli footballers
Expatriate footballers in Uruguay
Israeli expatriate sportspeople in Uruguay
Footballers from Majd al-Krum
Association football defenders